Helmi Höhle (13 October 1924 – 30 January 2012) was a German fencer. She finished in fourth place with the German foil team at the 1960 Summer Olympics. She won three medals in this event at the world championships in 1957–1959.

References

External links
 

1924 births
2012 deaths
German female fencers
Olympic fencers of the United Team of Germany
Fencers at the 1960 Summer Olympics
Sportspeople from Offenbach am Main
20th-century German people
21st-century German people